Rogaland Radio is a coast radio station in Sola, Norway. Operated by Telenor Maritim Radio, it has the responsibility for the coast between Søgne and Sognefjord. Established in 1960, it was originally located in Sandnes. It has since 2003 been jointly located with the Joint Rescue Coordination Centre of Southern Norway. It is responsible for transmitting maritime safety information via Navtex in Southern Norway.

References

Coast radio stations in Norway
Organisations based in Sola, Norway
Organisations based in Sandnes
1960 establishments in Norway